"The Song of Wandering Aengus" is a poem by Irish poet W. B. Yeats. It was first printed in 1897 in British magazine The Sketch under the title "A Mad Song." It was then published under its standard name in Yeats' 1899 anthology The Wind Among the Reeds. It is especially remembered for its two final lines: "The silver apples of the moon,/ The golden apples of the sun."

The poem is told from the point of view of an old man who, at some point in his past, had a fantastical experience in which a silver trout fish he had caught and laid on the floor turned into a "glimmering girl" who called him by his name, then vanished; he became infatuated with her, and remains devoted to finding her again.

In an 1899 letter to fellow poet Dora Sigerson, Yeats called "The Song of Wandering Aengus" "the kind of poem I like best myself—a ballad that gradually lifts ... from circumstantial to purely lyrical writing."

Meaning and inspiration
Yeats later said that "the poem was suggested to me by a Greek folk song; but the folk belief of Greece is very like that of Ireland, and I certainly thought, when I wrote it, of Ireland, and of the spirits that are in Ireland." At least one scholar has pointed to the Greek folk song "The Fruit of the Apple Tree" as the likely source of Yeats' inspiration. That song was included in a volume of Greek poetry translated by Lucy Garnett, which Yeats had written a review of in 1896.

It has been claimed that the poem's story is based on the Irish god Aengus, and specifically the story of the "Dream of Aengus", which had first appeared in the 8th century, in which Aengus falls in love with a woman whom he sees only in his dreams.

The poem has also been compared to the aisling genre of Irish poetry, in which a magical woman appears who represents the country of Ireland.

Cultural references
Both "The silver apples of the moon" and "The golden apples of the sun" have inspired the names of various bands (including the Silver Apples), albums (including Morton Subotnick's Silver Apples of the Moon), books (including Ray Bradbury's anthology The Golden Apples of the Sun and Eudora Welty's The Golden Apples) and films.

In the 2002 episode "Rogue Planet" of the TV series Star Trek: Enterprise, a member of a shape-shifting, telepathic alien species takes the form of a young woman to communicate with Captain Jonathan Archer, based on Archer's own childhood memories of hearing "The Song of Wandering Aengus". Part of the poem was also recited in the 2015 episode "No Room at the Inn" of the TV series The Leftovers.

In the 1995 film The Bridges of Madison County, when going for a walk after supper Robert Kincaid (Clint Eastwood) quotes the lines "The silver apples of the moon" and "The golden apples of the sun." Francesca Johnson (Meryl Streep) replies, "Yeats." Clint Eastwood's character talks about the themes of the poem and references his own Irish heritage. Later that night, she is alone on the porch reading Yeats' book of poems. Inspired, Francesca writes a note and drives to post it on Roseman bridge for Robert to find the next day. The note asks him for supper and quotes another line, "While white moths are on the wing."

Musical adaptations
The most famous musical setting of the poem was by Travis Edmonson of the folk duo Bud & Travis. Edmonson titled the song "Golden Apples of the Sun", and it was released on the 1960 Bud & Travis album Naturally: Folk Songs for the Present. Their version has been covered, sometimes as "Golden Apples of the Sun" and sometimes as "The Song of Wandering Aengus", by artists including Judy Collins (on the album Golden Apples of the Sun, 1962), Terry Callier (on The New Folk Sound of Terry Callier, 1965), Dave Van Ronk (on No Dirty Names, 1966), Christy Moore (on Ride On, 1984), Peg Millett (on Clear Horizon, 1994), Karan Casey (on Songlines, 1997), Paul Winter (on Celtic Solstice, 1999), 10,000 Maniacs (on Twice Told Tales, 2015) and Tiny Ruins (on Hurtling Through, 2015).

British singer Donovan recorded his own musical setting of the poem on the 1971 children's album HMS Donovan.

British-Irish band The Waterboys recorded their own musical adaptation of "The Song of Wandering Aengus" on the 2011 Yeats-themed album An Appointment with Mr Yeats.

It was also put to music by Benjamin Attahir.

Johnny Flynn put it to music through his adaptation of the poem, Wandering Aengus.

References

1897 poems
Poetry by W. B. Yeats